Haapiti Rahi, also known as Motu Haapiti Rahi, is a  private island in the lagoon of Bora Bora in French Polynesia.
It is the located between Krisu, and Tevairoa, near Haapiti Iti.

Administration
The island is part of Bora Bora Commune.

Tourism
The island is up for sale

Transportation

After arriving in Fa'a'ā International Airport, an Air Tahiti inter-island flight (50 minutes) will bring you to Bora Bora Airport.

There, you will need to hire a boat at the Rent-a-boat Office.

References

External links

 
Private islands of French Polynesia